Chai Badan is a district (amphoe) in the eastern part of Lopburi province, central Thailand. The local people usually call it Lam Narai, as the district center is in Tambon Lam Narai.

History
Chai Badan was an ancient town in the Pa Sak River valley, controlled from Nakhon Ratchasima. In 1914 it was upgraded to be a district of Phetchabun province. In 1918 it was moved to be part of Saraburi province. Finally it became part of Lopburi province on 1 November 1941.

In 1943 the district office was moved from Chai Badan Sub-district to Bua Chum Sub-district, which was undone one year later. In 1960 it was again moved to Bua Chum. The area around the district office was made the new Sub-district Lam Narai in 1970.

Geography
Neighbouring districts are (from the east clockwise) Lam Sonthi, Tha Luang, Phatthana Nikhom, Khok Samrong and Khok Charoen of Lopburi Province, and Si Thep of Phetchabun province.

The Wang Kan Luang waterfall is the most visited place by Lopburi visitors.

The district is the site of a Royal Thai Air Force gunnery range.

Administration
The district is divided into 17 sub-districts (tambons), which are further subdivided into 136 villages (mubans). Lam Narai has sub-district municipality status (thesaban tambon) and covers part of the tambon Lam Narai and Chai Narai. There are a further 16 tambon administrative organizations (TAO).

The missing numbers belong to tambon which now form Lam Sonthi District

References

External links
amphoe.com (Thai)

Chai Badan